United Airways is an airline of Bangladesh. Other airlines of similar name are:

United Airways Limited, a British airline that operated in 1935
British United Airways, an airline operating from 1960 to 1970
British United Island Airways

See also
United Airlines
United Airlines (disambiguation)